Gambharipank is a village situated besides old Ranchi road in Sambalpur district in the Indian state of Odisha, India. The village comes under Kukudapali panchayat and Jujomura block.

Demographics 
Sambalpuri is the main language spoken here. The total population of the village is 1200.

Agriculture is the primary economy for the village.

See also 
 Sambalpuri language

References 

Villages in Sambalpur district